Dixie Library Building is a historic library building located at Orangeburg in Orangeburg County, South Carolina. It was built about 1850, and is a one-story, frame Classical Revival style building. It has a small rear addition, a pedimented and low-pitched gable roof, and colonnade of Tuscan order piers. The building was moved in 1912 and 1955.

It was added to the National Register of Historic Places in 1985.

References

Libraries on the National Register of Historic Places in South Carolina
Neoclassical architecture in South Carolina
Library buildings completed in 1850
Buildings and structures in Orangeburg County, South Carolina
National Register of Historic Places in Orangeburg County, South Carolina